Daughter of Han: The Autobiography of a Chinese Working Woman, a 1945 book by Ida Pruitt, an autobiography in the form of rewritten interviews with Ning Lao T'ai-t'ai (Old Mrs. Ning; 1867 – after 1938, an illiterate Chinese village woman. 

Her family name is "Ning"; "Lao,"  "old," or "venerable," is a term of respect; and "t'ai t'ai" (pinyin tai-tai) is the title of a married woman. "Ning Lao T'ai-t'ai" is best translated as  "Old Mrs. Ning."

Contents

Mrs. Ning was born to a family that had seen better times in Penglai in Shandong province. Her father, once a scholar, sold baked goods to support his family. She contracted smallpox as a child. Her feet were bound to keep them small according to the customs of the time. When she was fifteen, she was married through an arranged marriage to an opium addict who sold all the family's possessions to support his habit. She began begging to support her family. Her husband sold one of her daughters and so she left him and became a servant to support herself and her other daughter. Later, she became a peddler. After several years, Ning moved back with her husband, who had quit his habit and she gave birth to a son. In the meantime, her daughter had married a husband who did not support his family so Ning was forced to support her daughter and grandchildren. Ning later moved in with her son in Beiping (now Beijing). She told Pruitt her story during the 1930s. The family remained in Beiping during the Japanese invasion but Pruitt did not know how they fared later.

Critical reactions and analysis
The anthropologist Francis L. K. Hsu welcomed the book in 1946, saying that Pruitt "deserves hearty congratulations from all her readers, who should include not only the social scientist, but the layman as well." He emphasizes that Mrs. Ning was steeped in traditional Chinese culture, which emphasizes fate and fatalism but her actual behavior is active, not passive or resigned. Her attitude was "no different from that of the forefathers of present day Americans who prayed to God but kept their powder dry." Chinese, he argues, are no more fatalistic than are Westerners but Chinese aspirations are grounded in a "golden" past while Western aspirations, especially American ones, are more likely to relate to the present and the future.

Notes

References
 
 

 

1867 births
20th-century deaths

Year of death uncertain
1945 books
Chinese autobiographies
Books about China